Croton wigginsii is a species of croton known by the common name Wiggins' croton.

Distribution
This small gray-green shrub is native to the Sonoran Deserts of northern Mexico and Arizona, into the Colorado Desert in California  where it is an inhabitant of sand dunes.

Description
Croton wigginsii is spreading shrub approaches a meter-3 feet in height. Its sparse foliage is made up of long oval-shaped leaves covered in a coating of white hairs. It is dioecious, with male plants bearing staminate flowers with thready stamens and female plants bearing pistillate flowers composed of the rounded immature fruits.

References

External links
Jepson Manual Treatment - Croton wigginsii
Croton wigginsii - Photo gallery
Arizona Native Plant Society profile

wigginsii
Flora of Northwestern Mexico
Flora of Arizona
Flora of the California desert regions
Flora of the Sonoran Deserts
Dioecious plants